"Can't Fight the Moonlight" is a song written by Diane Warren and performed by American singer LeAnn Rimes. It is the theme song of the film Coyote Ugly. Released as a single on August 22, 2000, the song reached the top 10 in 19 European countries, Australia, Canada, and New Zealand, topping the charts in 12 of these territories; it became Australia's best-selling single of 2001. In the United States, a different mix of the song peaked at number 11 on the Billboard Hot 100 in 2002.

The song appeared on Rimes's I Need You (2002) compilation album and The Best of LeAnn Rimes (2004) with the Graham Stack Radio Edit of the song (known as the "Latino Mix" internationally) included as a bonus track on the I Need You album as well as on the sequel soundtrack to the film, More Music from Coyote Ugly (2003). The remix was also included on her Greatest Hits (2003) album as well as on the remix edition of her Best of album.

A music video for the song was released in 2000 including clips taken from the Coyote Ugly film with Rimes performing at the "Coyote Ugly" bar.

Background
Rimes originally auditioned for the 2000 film Coyote Ugly to sing "Can't Fight the Moonlight" at the ending with Piper Perabo but, once Rimes watched some cuts of the film, she decided to provide the singing voice for all the songs sung by Perabo. In the film, the song has a fictional story of being written by main character Violet Sanford, which at the end of the film becomes her big break into the music business after Rimes records it. Rimes later shared with her audience of a 2017 concert that she really wanted “Can’t Fight The Moonlight”, but it was attached to Coyote Ugly. She agreed to sing for Piper Perabo on the movie because she so badly wanted to sing “Can’t Fight The Moonlight”. (this would include "But I Do Love You", as well as two other tracks on the soundtrack). The vocals Rimes provided are altered in their pitch and vocal range in comparison to her natural vocal range; and, the closing scene, wherein she and Perabo's character sing, is effectively her duetting with herself. The song's lyrics were slightly changed for film.

"Can't Fight the Moonlight" is a pop song of 3 minutes and 35 seconds. The song was written by American Grammy Award-winning songwriter, Diane Warren and performed by Rimes. The verses are written in the key of E-flat major with the first and second choruses in D-flat minor and the final chorus in D minor. The song is produced by Trevor Horn with executive production by Jerry Bruckheimer, Kathy Nelson and Mike Curb. Orchestral arrangements were done by David Campbell with engineering and mixing done by Steve MacMillan. Additional engineering was done by Tim Weidner, Greg Hunt, Gary Leach and Austin Deptula. According to Warren it is the first song she had written with so many key changes. A review by Billboard praised producer Trevor Horn by stating "Oh-so creatively produced by Trevor Horn with guitars, lush layers of harmony, and a funky albeit delicate hip-hop track (no, really), this easy-flowing midtempo popper is a sassy number, demonstrating that Rimes has crossed the line to adult-leaning lyrics."

Release
"Can't Fight the Moonlight" was first released on the soundtrack for Coyote Ugly on August 1, 2000. It was released in the US on a CD single on August 22, 2000, along with the song, "But I Do Love You" (also included on the soundtrack) as the B-side track. The song was later released on a maxi-single which included several remixes of the song. The song was also included on Rimes's 2002 compilation album, I Need You, with the Graham Stack Radio Edit of the song included as a bonus track. In 2003, the Graham Stack Radio Edit of the song would be included on the More Music from Coyote Ugly soundtrack on January 28, 2003. and Rimes' Greatest Hits album on November 18, 2003. In 2004, the song was included on The Best of LeAnn Rimes, while the Graham Stack Radio Edit (known as the "Latino Mix" internationally) was released on the remixed edition.

Critical reception
Wendy Mitchell of Barnes & Noble.com praised the song calling it "ultra-catchy". Heather Phares of AllMusic considered the song to be a "positively Britney Spearsian power ballad". A review in Billboard about Rimes and the song stated that the song "is by far her most compelling pop offering yet–and one of the more intriguing compositions of late from songwriter superwoman Diane Warren."

Commercial performance
The song reached the top 20 in every country it charted in. It reached number one in the United Kingdom for one week in November 2000. It also reached number one in Australia in January 2001 and went on to become the highest selling single in Australia of 2001. It went triple platinum in Australia selling over 210,000 copies. In New Zealand, it went to number one, dropped to number three the next week, then returned to number one again for a week. In Ireland, it reached number one in November 2000 for two weeks and is currently the 18th best selling single in the history of the Irish charts. In the US, it enjoyed two chart runs on the Billboard Hot 100. On its original chart run in 2000, "Can't Fight the Moonlight" stalled at number 71. It regained interest in late 2001 and 2002 thanks to radio airplay of the Graham Stack remix, and rose up the charts to number 11. In the US, the single is certified gold by the RIAA (which signifies sales of 500,000+ copies). The song spent 42 weeks on the charts and sold 668,000 copies.

, it is Rimes's last song to chart in the top 40 on the Billboard Hot 100 at number 11. Due to Rimes's previous success in country music, even though this song was not officially released to country radio, it still made it at number 61 on the Billboard Country Song chart in its first release due to unsolicited airplay as an album cut. It also has had the distinction of taking the longest time to reach the top 40, 29 weeks, until Of Monsters and Men's "Little Talks" took one week more in 2012.

The single has sold over 2 million copies worldwide. It sold over 530,000 copies in the United Kingdom as stated by Britain's Official Charts Company. The song was the 12th best seller of 2000 in the UK and the 55th of the 2000 decade.

Music video
A music video for the song was released in 2000 by Touchstone Pictures and directed by David McNally, the director of Coyote Ugly. The video features Rimes wearing a white tank top and brown striped latex pants singing at the "Coyote Ugly" bar, and dancing with Izabella Miko and the other girls who worked at the bar in the film. The video also features various scenes taken from the film. The music video was included as a bonus feature on both the theatrical and uncut DVD releases of the film.

Live performances
On February 1, 2001, Rimes performed the song on Music in High Places. The performance was later featured on the limited edition bonus DVD included with her Greatest Hits album. On April 10, she performed it live at the 7th Blockbuster Entertainment Awards. On May 9, she performed a "beat box-driven" version of the song live at the 36th Academy of Country Music Awards, being accompanied by bare-chested dancers. Rimes also performed the song on Sessions@AOL.

Covers and samples
South Korean singer Lee Hyori performed the song during 2003's MBC Drama Awards. American singer Ava Max sampled the song on her 2022 single "Million Dollar Baby".

Track listings

Australian CD single
 "Can't Fight the Moonlight" — 3:35
 "But I Do Love You" — 3:20
 "Can't Fight the Moonlight" (Graham Stack Radio Edit) — 3:35
 "Can't Fight the Moonlight" (Thunderpuss Club Mix) — 8:46
 "Can't Fight The Moonlight" (Sharp Club Vocal Mix) — 7:35
 "Can't Fight the Moonlight" (Almighty Mix) — 7:52

European CD single
 "Can't Fight the Moonlight" — 3:35
 "But I Do Love You" — 3:20
 "Can't Fight the Moonlight" (Graham Stack Radio Edit) — 3:35

 European CD maxi single
 "Can't Fight the Moonlight" (Latino Mix) — 3:32
 "Can't Fight the Moonlight" (Thunderpuss Club Mix) — 8:45
 "Can't Fight the Moonlight" (Almighty Radio Edit) — 3:58
 "Can't Fight the Moonlight" (Sharp Radio Edit) — 3:38

 US CD and cassette single
 "Can't Fight the Moonlight" — 3:35
 "But I Do Love You" — 3:20

 US maxi-CD single, US and UK digital download
 "Can't Fight the Moonlight" (Graham Stack Radio Edit) — 3:35
 "Can't Fight the Moonlight" (Thunderpuss Radio Edit) — 3:36
 "Can't Fight the Moonlight" (Plasmic Honey Radio Edit) — 3:22
 "Can't Fight the Moonlight" (Almighty Mix) — 7:49
 "Can't Fight the Moonlight" (Sharp Club Vocal Edit) — 5:40
 "Can't Fight the Moonlight" (Thunderpuss Club Mix) — 8:46
 "Can't Fight the Moonlight" (Plasmic Honey Club Mix Edit) — 6:37
 "Can't Fight the Moonlight" (Sharp Pistol Dub) — 5:46

Personnel
Credits for "Can't Fight the Moonlight" adapted from the liner notes of the Coyote Ugly soundtrack.

 Steve MacMillan - engineer, mixing
 Tim Pierce - guitar
 Jamie Muhoberac - keyboards, bass
 Lee Sklar - bass
 John Robinson - drums
 Curt Bisquera - drums
 Alan Pasqua - piano
 David Campbell - orchestra arrangement
 Sue Ann Carwell - background vocals

 LeAnn Rimes - lead vocals, background vocals
 Niki Harris - background vocals
 Tim Weidner - additional engineering
 Greg Hunt - additional engineering
 Gary Leach - additional engineering
 Austin Deptula - additional engineering
 Sara Lind - technical assistant
 Robert Orton - technical assistant
 Gavin Lurssen - mastering

Charts

Weekly charts

Year-end charts

Decade-end charts

Certifications

Release history

See also
 Dutch Top 40 number-one hits of 2000
 List of number-one singles from the 2000s (UK)
 List of number-one singles of 2000 (Ireland)
 List of songs by Diane Warren
 List of Swedish number-one hits
 List of number-one singles in Australia in 2001
 List of number-one singles from the 2000s (New Zealand)
 List of Romanian Top 100 number ones of the 2000s
 Ultratop 50 number-one hits of 2001

References

External links
 Can't Fight the Moonlight Music Video at Official website

2000 singles
2000 songs
2000s ballads
APRA Award winners
Curb Records singles
Dutch Top 40 number-one singles
Irish Singles Chart number-one singles
LeAnn Rimes songs
London Records singles
Number-one singles in Australia
Number-one singles in Finland
Number-one singles in Hungary
Number-one singles in New Zealand
Number-one singles in Romania
Number-one singles in Scotland
Number-one singles in Sweden
Pop ballads
Song recordings produced by Trevor Horn
Songs written by Diane Warren
Songs written for films
UK Singles Chart number-one singles
Ultratop 50 Singles (Flanders) number-one singles